Engin is a given name and a surname. In Turkish Engin means profound, broad, extensive, depth. Notable persons with that name include:

Persons with the given name
 Engin Akyürek (born 1981), Turkish actor
 Engin Alan (born 1945), Turkish general
 Engin Altay (born 1963), Turkish politician
 Engin Ardıç (born 1952), Turkish writer and journalist
 Engin Arık (1948–2007), Turkish particle physicist
 Engin Atsür (born 1984), Turkish basketball player
 Engin Baytar (born 1983), Turkish footballer
 Engin Bekdemir (born 1992), Turkish footballer
 Engin Çeber (1979–2008), Turkish human rights activist
 Engin Altan Düzyatan (born 1979), Turkish actor
 Engin Fırat (born 1970), Turkish football manager
 Engin Günaydın (born 1972), Turkish actor and comedian
 Engin Güngör (born 1986), Turkish footballer
 Engin İpekoğlu (born 1961), Turkish footballer
 Engin Noyan, Turkish musician
 Engin Oeztuerk (born 1973), German–Turkish musician
 Engin Öztonga (born 1978), Turkish footballer
 Engin Ünal (born 1936), Turkish swimmer
 Engin Verel (born 1956), Turkish footballer

Persons with the surname
 Ahmet Engin (born 1996), German football player
 Atilla Engin (1946–2019), Turkish-American fusion jazz musician
 Esin Engin (1945–1997), Turkish musician
 Kenan Engin (born 1974), German-Turkish political scientist
 Korel Engin (born 1980), Turkish basketball player
 Engin Yıldırım (born 1966), Turkish labor economics professor and the vice-president of the Constitutional Court of Turkey
 Engin Yılmaz (born 1977), Turkish politician

See also
 ENGIN-X, dedicated materials engineering beamline at the ISIS neutron source
 Engin Blindé du Génie, armoured engineering vehicle
 Engin de débarquement amphibie rapide, Roll-on/Roll-off catamaran landing crafts

References

Turkish-language surnames
Turkish masculine given names